Isabelle was a  Belgian comic series drawn by Will and written by André Franquin, Delporte and Raymond Macherot.

The comic first appeared in Spirou magazine in 1969. Created by a top team of already-famous contributors to the magazine, the series gained a small but fanatical following. The first stories were written by Franquin (of Gaston Lagaffe fame), Delporte (editor of Spirou and writer of many comics) and Macherot (creator of Sibylline). Later, Delporte alone wrote the stories in collaboration with Will. Twelve albums were published until the series ended with Will's death in 2000.

Plot
The little girl Isabelle (named after Franquin's daughter) gets into a lot of adventures when the evil witch Kalendula troubles Isabelle's uncle Hermès and his fiancée, the good witch Calendula (who is the descendant of the evil Kalendula). Other stories are about a magical painting, a flying village or a floating island.

The stories have a poetical tone, although mixed with tons of jokes and puns, rhyming ghosts, a talking diamond and Isabelle's down-to-earth aunt –  whose greatest concern when Isabelle gets into an adventure is whether she's dressed warmly enough, even when she descends into Hades. The drawings are packed with details and the poetic nature of the stories comes through in the imaginative animals and backgrounds.

Reprints
All the stories have recently been reprinted in three omnibus editions by Le Lombard.

Dupuis titles
Lombard Editions titles
Belgian comic strips
Fantasy comics
Belgian comics characters
Child characters in comics
Fictional Belgian people
1969 comics debuts
2000 comics endings
Comics about women
Female characters in comics